Andre Castro may refer to:
André Castro (born 1988), Portuguese football midfielder
André Castro (footballer, born 1991), Brazilian football right-back
Andre Castro (racing driver) (born 1999), American racing driver